The National Union for Democracy and Renewal (abbreviated UNDR) is a political party in Chad, led by Saleh Kebzabo.

In the 1997 parliamentary election, UNDR won 15 out of 125 seats. In the parliamentary election held on 21 April 2002, the party won five out of 155 seats.

Kebzabo was the UNDR's candidate in the June 1996 presidential election, placing third with 8.61% of the vote. He was also the party's candidate in the presidential election held on 20 May 2001, winning 7.0% of the vote.

The UNDR is a member party of the Coordination of Political Parties for the Defense of the Constitution (CPDC), the main opposition coalition opposed to the rule of president Idriss Déby.

References

1992 establishments in Chad
Consultative member parties of the Socialist International
Political parties established in 1992
Political parties in Chad
Social democratic parties in Africa
Socialist parties in Chad